Edward Greene may refer to:
Ed Greene (fl. 1960s-1990s), American drummer and session musician
Edward Greene (MP) (1815–1891), British political figure, member of Parliament for Bury St Edmunds, 1865–1881, and Stowmarket, 1886–1891
Sir Edward Greene, 1st Baronet (1842–1920), British political figure, member of Parliament for Bury St Edmunds, 1900–1906
Edward Lee Greene (1843–1915), American botanist, associated with the Smithsonian Institution
Edward L. Greene (1884–1952), American football player and coach of football and baseball
Edward Greene (sport shooter) (1875–1957), American sport shooter
Edward Burnaby Greene (c. 1735–1788), English landowner, poet and translator

See also
Edward Green (disambiguation)
Ted Greene (disambiguation)